June 1 - Eastern Orthodox Church calendar - June 3

All fixed commemorations below celebrated on June 15 by Orthodox Churches on the Old Calendar.

For June 2nd, Orthodox Churches on the Old Calendar commemorate the Saints listed on May 20.

Saints
 Hieromartyr Pothinus, Bishop of Lyons (177)  (see also: July 25)
 Martyrs Blandina and Ponticus of Lyons, and companions (177)
 Martyr Alcibiades, at Lugdunum (Lyons) (177)
 Holy 38 martyrs, sealed inside a bath house.
 Three children-martyrs and their mother, by the sword.
 Venerable Dodo of the St David-Gareji Monastery, Georgia (623) (see also: May 17)
 Saint Nicephorus the Confessor, Patriarch of Constantinople (828)
 Venerable Marinus of Constantinople, son of St. Mary the New, of Byzia (c. 930)

Pre-Schism Western saints
 Hieromartyrs Marcellinus the priest, and Peter the exorcist, at Rome (304)
 Hieromartyr Erasmus of Formia, Bishop of Formia in Campania, and 20,000 martyrs with him (303)
 Martyrs Cyriacus and Apollinaris, in North Africa.
 Saint Eugene I, Pope of Rome, Confessor (657)
 Venerable Adalgis of Novara (Adalgis of Thiérache, Adelgis, Algis), disciple of St Fursey who preached around Arras and Laon in the north of France (c. 686)
 Venerable Bodfan (Bobouan), patron saint of Abern in Gwynedd in Wales (7th century)
 Saint Nicholas the Pilgrim (Nicholas Peregrinus), a Greek Fool-for-Christ, confessor (1094)
 Saint Odo (Oda, Odo the Good), Archbishop of Canterbury (958)

Post-Schism Orthodox saints
 Saint Nicephorus, Bishop of Milet (11th century)
 Great-martyr John the New of Suceava (John of Trebizond), at Belgorod (Cetatea Alba) (1330-1340)
 Right-believing Prince Andrew of Nizhegorod (1365)
 New Martyr Demetrius of Philadelphia (1657)
 New Martyr Constantine the former Hagarene, at Constantinople (1819)
 Martyr Leander, of Epirus.

Other commemorations
 Icon of the Mother of God of Kiev-Bratsk (1654)
 Uncovering of the relics (1819) of St. Juliana, Princess of Vyazma, Novotorzhok (1406)
 Slaying of Monk Chariton of Holy Archangels Monastery, Kosovo (1999)

Icon gallery

Notes

References

Sources
 June 2/15. Orthodox Calendar (PRAVOSLAVIE.RU).
 June 15 / June 2. HOLY TRINITY RUSSIAN ORTHODOX CHURCH (A parish of the Patriarchate of Moscow).
 June 2. OCA - The Lives of the Saints.
 The Autonomous Orthodox Metropolia of Western Europe and the Americas (ROCOR). St. Hilarion Calendar of Saints for the year of our Lord 2004. St. Hilarion Press (Austin, TX). p. 41.
 The Second Day of the Month of June. Orthodoxy in China.
 June 2. Latin Saints of the Orthodox Patriarchate of Rome.
 The Roman Martyrology. Transl. by the Archbishop of Baltimore. Last Edition, According to the Copy Printed at Rome in 1914. Revised Edition, with the Imprimatur of His Eminence Cardinal Gibbons. Baltimore: John Murphy Company, 1916. pp. 160–162.
 Rev. Richard Stanton. A Menology of England and Wales, or, Brief Memorials of the Ancient British and English Saints Arranged According to the Calendar, Together with the Martyrs of the 16th and 17th Centuries. London: Burns & Oates, 1892. pp. 251–252.

 Greek Sources
 Great Synaxaristes:  2 ΙΟΥΝΙΟΥ. ΜΕΓΑΣ ΣΥΝΑΞΑΡΙΣΤΗΣ.
  Συναξαριστής. 2 Ιουνίου. ECCLESIA.GR. (H ΕΚΚΛΗΣΙΑ ΤΗΣ ΕΛΛΑΔΟΣ).
  02/06/. Ορθόδοξος Συναξαριστής.

 Russian Sources
  15 июня (2 июня). Православная Энциклопедия под редакцией Патриарха Московского и всея Руси Кирилла (электронная версия). (Orthodox Encyclopedia - Pravenc.ru).
  2 июня по старому стилю / 15 июня по новому стилю. Русская Православная Церковь - Православный церковный календарь на  год.
  2 июня (ст.ст.) 15 июня  (нов. ст.). Русская Православная Церковь Отдел внешних церковных связей. (DECR).

June in the Eastern Orthodox calendar